Two ships of the Soviet Navy have been named for the Bolshevik leader Sergei Mironovich Kirov. Both have been the lead ships of their classes.
  - a 
  - a  missile cruiser subsequently named Admiral Ushakov

Russian Navy ship names
Soviet Navy ship names